Wyngarde may refer to:

People
Peter Wyngarde (1927–2018), British actor

Characters
Mastermind (Jason Wyngarde), a Marvel comics villain (the first Marvel Comics supervillain to use the title)
Lady Mastermind (Regan Wyngarde), one of Jason Wyngarde's daughters
Mastermind (Martinique Jason) (born Martinique Wyngarde), one of Jason Wyngarde's daughters